Kostinbrod Pass (‘Kostinbrodski Prohod’ \'ko-stin-brod-ski 'pro-hod\) is the ice-covered saddle of elevation 1417 m separating Doyran Heights from Flowers Hills in Sentinel Range, Ellsworth Mountains in Antarctica.  It is part of the glacial divide between Valoga Glacier and Sikera Valley.

The pass is named after the town of Kostinbrod in Western Bulgaria.

Location
US mapping in 1961, updated in 1988.

Maps
 Vinson Massif.  Scale 1:250 000 topographic map.  Reston, Virginia: US Geological Survey, 1988.
 Antarctic Digital Database (ADD). Scale 1:250000 topographic map of Antarctica. Scientific Committee on Antarctic Research (SCAR). Since 1993, regularly updated.

Notes

References
 Kostinbrod Pass. SCAR Composite Antarctic Gazetteer.
 Bulgarian Antarctic Gazetteer. Antarctic Place-names Commission. (details in Bulgarian, basic data in English)

External links
 Kostinbrod Pass. Copernix satellite image

Mountain passes of Ellsworth Land
Bulgaria and the Antarctic